Raoulia is a genus of New Zealand plants in the tribe Gnaphalieae within the family Asteraceae.

Many Raoulia species grow in alpine areas, forming very fine and dense growths. These compact growths form large amorphous cushion-like masses with only the growing tips visible. Due to their shape and form, the plant clusters resemble sheep from afar, this giving them their alternate name, vegetable sheep.

The range of some species, such as Raoulia beauverdii, includes coastal places.

Taxonomy
 Species

 Formerly included
 Argyrotegium mackayi (''Raoulia mackayi)

Cultivation
Slow spreading, flat rock garden plant with silver-gray, almost moss-like, foliage.
 sun:	 full sun, part shade
 height: 2 inches
 width: spreads to around 1 ft.
 water: regular
 hardiness: 20 °F according to one source, 35 degrees F according to another
 heat tolerance: unknown

See also
 Vegetable Lamb of Tartary (mythological plant)

References

Endemic flora of New Zealand
Asteraceae genera
Gnaphalieae